Sidetracked is a 2015 comedy film written and directed by Álvaro Fernández Armero, which stars Inma Cuesta and Raúl Arévalo alongside Alberto San Juan, Candela Peña, Jorge Bosch, Irene Escolar and Kiti Mánver.

Plot 
The plot follows a couple (Luisa and Alberto) at a low ebb, both in personal and professional terms, who decide to move to the countryside.

Cast

Production 
The film was produced by Morena Films (Juan Gordon) and All My Friends & Family AIE, with the participation of TVE, Canal+ and the Cabildo of Gran Canaria. It was shot in 2014. Shooting locations included Madrid, Valdeprados and Gran Canaria.

Release 

Distributed by eOne Films Spain, Sidetracked was theatrically released in Spain on 30 January 2015. The film was also selected to be the closing film of the 32nd Miami International Film Festival in March 2015.

Reception 
Pere Vall of Fotogramas rated the film 3 out of 5 stars, extolling the performance delivered by Candela Peña as the best thing about the film.

Javier Cortijo of Cinemanía scored 2½ out of 5 stars, summing up the film to be an "irregular rural and nineties apology from an expert in the latter", Fernández Armero, a staple of the (dated) 1990s Spanish romantic-urbanite dramedy genre.

See also 
 List of Spanish films of 2015

References

External links 
 Sidetracked at ICAA's Catálogo de Cinespañol

Films about internal migration
Spanish comedy films
2015 films
2015 comedy films
Films shot in the province of Segovia
Films shot in Madrid
Films shot in the Canary Islands
Morena Films films
2010s Spanish-language films
2010s Spanish films